Peter Eden Martinez is a Belizean politician and member of the United Democratic Party. He served a single term as Area Representative in the House of Representatives from the Toledo East constituency from 2008 to 2012.

Political career
Martinez was first selected as the UDP nominee in Toledo East in 2003 but was defeated by the PUP incumbent, Michael Espat. He defeated Espat in a 2008 rematch.

While in office Martinez served as the Minister of Human Development and Social Transformation in the cabinet of Prime Minister Dean Barrow.

Martinez ran for re-election in 2012, once again against Espat, but was defeated.

References

Year of birth missing (living people)
Living people
United Democratic Party (Belize) politicians
Government ministers of Belize
Members of the Belize House of Representatives for Toledo East